Hariri (in Arabic حريري) is a surname and derivative of harir (in Arabic حرير meaning silk) which indicates a mercantile background at one point in that field.

People

Historic
 Ali Hariri (1009-1079), Kurdish poet
 Al-Hariri of Basra (1054–1122), Arab poet, scholar of the Arabic language and a high government official of the Seljuk Empire

Surname

Family of Rafic Hariri

 Ayman Hariri (born 1978), Lebanese businessman, son of Rafic Hariri
 Bahia Hariri (born 1952), Lebanese politician, sister of Rafic Hariri
 Bahaa Hariri (born 1966), Lebanese business tycoon, son of Rafic Hariri
 Fahd Hariri (born 1980/1981), Lebanese businessman and property developer, the son of Rafic Hariri
 Hind Hariri (born 1984), daughter and youngest child of Rafic Hariri
 Nazik Hariri, widow of Rafic Hariri
 Rafic Hariri (1944–2005), business tycoon and Lebanese Prime Minister; assassinated
 Saad Hariri  (born 1970), politician, business tycoon, Lebanese Prime Minister, and son of Rafic Hariri

Other people
 Abbas Hariri, Iranian wrestler
 Abu Al-Izz Al-Hariri (1946–2014), Egyptian politician and member of parliament 
 Abdulhadi Al Hariri (born 1992), Syrian footballer
 Fawzi Hariri (born 1958), Iraqi Minister of Industry and Minerals (since 2006)
 Franso Hariri (1937–2001), Kurdish Iraqi politician
 Lamia Al Hariri, Syrian diplomat
 May Hariri (born 1972), Lebanese pop artist and actress
 Naser al-Hariri, Syrian politician
 Omar El-Hariri (c. 1944–2015), Libyan politician, minister, leading figure of the National Transitional Council of Libya
 Robert Hariri, MD, PhD, former CEO of Celgene Cellular Therapuetics, and co-founder of Human Longevity, Inc.
 Salman Al-Hariri (born 1988), Saudi footballer
 Siamak Hariri (born 1958), a Canadian architect
 Wahbi al-Hariri (1914–1994), Syrian-American architect, artist and author
 Ziad al-Hariri (born 1930), Syrian Army chief of staff

Given name
 Hariri Safii (born 1989), Malaysian footballer

Businesses
 Hariri & Hariri Architecture, New York, U.S.
 Hariri Pontarini Architects, Toronto, Canada

Places
 Beirut–Rafic Hariri International Airport, Lebanon
 Nazik Al-Hariri Welfare Center for Special Education, Amman, Jordan
 Rafic El-Hariri Stadium, Beirut, Lebanon
 Rafik Hariri University Hospital, Beirut, Lebanon

See also
 Harari (disambiguation)

Arabic-language surnames